FTX Games is an American video game publisher based in San Diego. Originally founded as Funtactix in 2006, the company was acquired by Playtech in March 2016 and was rebranded as FTX Games. In July 2020, FTX Games was acquired by Tilting Point Media.

History
Funtactix was founded in Israel in 2006 by Yaron Leifenberg and Ilan Graicer, backed by Jerusalem Venture Partners (JVP) and Benchmark Capital. Based on an internally developed engine, the company launched Moondo, which enabled players to create and port their character avatar across web-based, online 3D  multiplayer games.

In 2009, the company switched to a Flash and HTML5 platform to create IP-based games. This included a partnership with Paramount, to create licensed social games for select IPs, such as Rango: The World or Mission: Impossible - The Game, based on the Rango and Mission: Impossible film franchises, respectively. In partnership with Lions Gate Entertainment, Funtactix announced The Hunger Games Adventures in 2012 based on The Hunger Games film series. The game was released on Facebook (March 23, 2012), iPad (September 2012), and iPhone (February 7, 2013).

By 2016, Funtactix was acquired by Playtech and officially rebranded as FTX Games. In July 2020, FTX Games was acquired by Tilting Point Media.

Games

Awards
 2013 Webby – Best Social Game on Tablet and Other Devices
 2013 Webby – People’s Voice Award
 2013 Variety – Best Entertainment IP-based Mobile Game
 2012 Forbes – Top 10 Tech Company in Israel

References

External links 
 

Video game companies established in 2006
2006 establishments in Israel
Companies based in San Diego
Mobile game companies
Video game development companies
2016 mergers and acquisitions
Video game companies based in California
Video game publishers